Ein al-Asad ( "the lion's spring") is a Druze village in northern Israel. Located near Maghar in the Galilee, it falls under the jurisdiction of Merom HaGalil Regional Council.

History
The community was founded in the mid to late 19th century by Druze from nearby Beit Jann, who were later joined by Druze migrants from Lebanon and Jabal al-Druze in Syria. It was named after an eponymous wellspring outside the village.

British Mandate era
In the 1922 census of Palestine conducted by the British Mandate authorities, Ein al-Asad had a population of 48, of whom 47 were Druze and one a Christian, increasing in the 1931 census to 81; 80 Druze and one Christian and a total of 18 houses. In the 1945 statistics, the population of Ein al-Asad together with  Beit Jann was 1,640, all classified as "others" (meaning Druze, 120 of which were indicated as being in Ein al-Asad), who owned 43,550 dunams of land according to an official land and population survey. 2,530 dunams were plantations and irrigable land, while 7,406 dunams were used for cereals and 67 dunams were built-up (urban) land.

See also
Druze in Israel

References

Bibliography

External links
Welcome To  'Ayn al-'Asad
Survey of Western Palestine, Map 4:  IAA, Wikimedia commons

Arab villages in Israel
Druze communities in Israel
Populated places established in 1899
Populated places in Northern District (Israel)
1899 establishments in the Ottoman Empire